{{DISPLAYTITLE:71 knot}}

In knot theory, the 71 knot, also known as the septoil knot, the septafoil knot, or the (7, 2)-torus knot, is one of seven prime knots with crossing number seven.  It is the simplest torus knot after the trefoil and cinquefoil.

Properties
The 71 knot is invertible but not amphichiral.  Its Alexander polynomial is

its Conway polynomial is

and its Jones polynomial is

Example

See also
Heptagram

References